Center Point may refer to:
Center Point, Faulkner County, Arkansas
Center Point, Howard County, Arkansas
Center Point, Polk County, Arkansas